Karatau is an urban-type settlement of Karakalpakstan in Uzbekistan. Administratively, it is part of the city Nukus.

References

Populated places in Karakalpakstan
Urban-type settlements in Uzbekistan